Fitzroy Hemphill (21 November 1860–1930), was a British baron and Liberal Party politician, the son of Charles Hare Hemphill, the first baron, and he succeeded his brother to the barony on 26 March 1918. Fitzroy was a barrister of the Middle Temple from 1899, served as a justice of the peace for County Galway. As well as politics he was a captain in 2nd battalion King's Own Scottish Borderers; a representative member of London's Territorial Force, Justice of the peace in Galway, Ireland; and 'Chevalier' of the Legion of Honour.

His mother was Augusta Stanhope, the daughter of the Hon. Sir Charles Francis Stanhope, a son of Charles Stanhope, 3rd Earl of Harrington. He married Mary Martyn on 27 February 1897, and they had one son, Martyn, who succeeded his father to the barony.

Arms

References

Work cited

1860 births
1930 deaths
Liberal Party (UK) hereditary peers
Members of the Middle Temple
Barons in the Peerage of the United Kingdom